This is a list of programmes broadcast on South Korean cable television channel OCN.

Dramas

Monday–Tuesday

OCN Pick
OCN Pick was the name used while My Secret Romance was airing, however, it was later changed to OCN Romance Series.
 My Secret Romance (애타는 로맨스; 2017)
 Meloholic (멜로홀릭; 2017)
 My First Love (애간장; 2018)
 Short (쇼트; 2018)
 Evergreen (그남자 오수; 2018)

Wednesday–Thursday

OCN Original
 The Guest (손: The Guest; 2018)
 Quiz of God: Reboot (신의 퀴즈5; 2018)
 Possessed (빙의; 2019)
 Save Me 2 (구해줘2; 2019)
 Class of Lies (미스터 기간제; 2019)
 The Running Mates: Human Rights (달리는 조사관; 2019)

Saturday–Sunday

OCN Original

OCN Dramatic Cinema
A project which combines film and drama formats.
 Trap (트랩; 2019)
 Hell Is Other People (타인은 지옥이다; 2019)
 Team Bulldog: Off-Duty Investigation (번외수사; 2020)
 Search (써치; 2020)
 Dark Hole (다크홀; 2021)

OCN TV Movie series
 Same Bed, Different Dreams (동상이몽; November 28, 2004 – January 2, 2005) - 6 omnibus episodes
 Family Scandal (가족연애사; December 9 – 30, 2005)
 Family Scandal 2 (가족연애사 2; January 5 – 26, 2007)
  (키드갱; May 18 – August 9, 2007)
 Temptation of Eve (이브의 유혹; August 24 – September 14, 2007) - 4 omnibus episodes
 Company Love (직장연애사; November 9 – 30, 2007)
  (메디컬 기방 영화관; November 20, 2007 – January 22, 2008)
 Children's Series (애시리즈; December 10 – 24, 2007) - 3 omnibus episodes
 The Tales of Nights (천일야화; December 14, 2007 – January 25, 2008) - 8 omnibus episodes
 Samin Samsaek (삼인삼색; January 17 – 31, 2008)
 The Art of Seduction (유혹의 기술; March 28 – April 18, 2008)
 Comic Battle - Director Jang vs Director Kim (코믹배틀 - 장감독 vs 김감독; May 9, 2008) - 1 episode
 Don't Ask Me About the Past (과거를 묻지 마세요; May 17 – June 8, 2008)
 Kyungsung Theater's Back Room (경성 기방 영화관; May 17 – June 14, 2008) - 10 omnibus episodes
 My Lady Boss, My Hero (여사부일체; September 19 – November 7, 2008)
 The Tales of Nights 2 (천일야화 2; October 12 – November 4, 2008)
 An Erotic Actor Murder Case (에로배우 살인사건; November 14 – 21, 2008) - 2 omnibus episodes
  (사랑은 맛있다;  December 18, 2008) - 1 episode
  (조선추리활극 정약용; November 27, 2009 – January 15, 2010)
 Sidus FNH (싸이더스FNH;  December 7, 2013 – April 17, 2014)

References

External links
  

OCN original programming
Orion Cinema Network
Orion Cinema Network